Dominika Cibulková was the defending champion, but lost to Garbiñe Muguruza in the first round.

World No. 1 Serena Williams won her third Bank of the West Classic title in four years, defeating Angelique Kerber in the final.

Sabine Lisicki hit the fastest serve of all time in women's tennis, blasting a 131 mph serve against Ana Ivanovic in the first round. As a result of her quarterfinals run, former world No. 1, Ivanovic, returned to top ten in WTA rankings for the first time since her loss to Victoria Azarenka at the 2009 French Open. Azarenka had previously replaced Ivanovic in the top ten.

This tournament also marked the WTA Tour main-draw debut of future four-time Grand Slam champion and world No. 1, Naomi Osaka.

Seeds
The top four seeds receive a bye into the second round.

Draw

Finals

Top half

Bottom half

Qualifying

Seeds

Qualifiers

Qualifying draw

First qualifier

Second qualifier

Third qualifier

Fourth qualifier

References

External links
 WTA tournament draws

Bank of the West Classic - Singles
2014 Singles